John Hayes Mabley, better known by his stage name Doktor Haze or Dr. Haze, is a British circus owner and performer, singer-songwriter, company director, and author. He is the owner, ringmaster and director of The Circus of Horrors, in which he co-founded with Gerry Cottle in 1995, which has become Britain’s longest running alternative circus. 

Haze was raised in Preston, Lancashire and his parents were circus performers as well. In 2011, he released his autobiography book Dr Haze: Mud, Blood and Glitter. Haze is the company director for Moscow State Circus, Carters Steam Fair and Psycho Management, and is also the co-owner of Circus Extreme and Continental Circus Berlin. In 2017, he stood as an independent candidate for Brighton Kemptown.

References

Bibliography 

Year of birth missing (living people)
Living people
Circus owners
British circus performers